The Adventures of Tugboat Annie is a 1957 Canadian-filmed comedy television series starring Minerva Urecal as Annie Brennan, the widowed captain of the tugboat "Narcissus", and Walter Sande as Horatio J. Bullwinkle, the captain of the "Salamander". The syndicated series lasted for 39 episodes.

Background
Norman Reilly Raine's stories of the salty tugboat captain Annie Brennan, a character based on the life of Thea Foss, first appeared in prose form in the weekly US journal Saturday Evening Post in the late 1920s. She was soon developed into a film character, depicted in three films and portrayed by a different actress in each (Marie Dressler in Tugboat Annie, 1933; Marjorie Rambeau in Tugboat Annie Sails Again, 1940; and Jane Darwell in Captain Tugboat Annie, 1945).

Development
In 1954, a television series was commissioned by the independent American production company TPA. The pilot took two years to complete, at a then-record cost of $129,000. Elsa Lanchester, Jay C. Flippen, and Chill Wills were all in line for major roles at one point or another at this early stage. The series was filmed in Toronto harbor and was first shown in Canada, having attracted ratings good enough to interest American television stations. What had succeeded in Canada proved a disappointment in the United States, where the viewing audiences had presumably become accustomed to greater sophistication than the simplistic humor of this series. The show was also screened in the United Kingdom, but is now largely forgotten.

Plot
Annie Brennan, widowed and the former skipper of a garbage scow, now captains a ship owned by the Severn Tugboat Company. A sympathetic, 50-year-old woman, her adventures consist of the humorous situations that develop when she attempts to assist people in trouble. Horatio Bullwinkle, a rival tugboat captain refers to her as "The Old Petticoat". The two of them traded insults and stole jobs from each other throughout the run of the series.

Cast
 Minerva Urecal as Annie Brennan
 Walter Sande as Horatio J. Bullwinkle
 Eric Clavering as Shiftless, Annie's deckhand
 Don Orlando as Pinto, Annie's cook

References

External links 
 

1957 Canadian television series debuts
1958 Canadian television series endings
Tugboats in fiction
First-run syndicated television programs in the United States
Black-and-white Canadian television shows
English-language television shows
1950s Canadian sitcoms
1950s American sitcoms
Nautical television series